is an interchange passenger railway station serving Kichijōji in the city of Musashino, Tokyo, Japan, operated by East Japan Railway Company (JR East) and the private railway operator Keio Corporation.

Lines
The station is 14 minutes from Shinjuku and 28 minutes from Tokyo by Chuo Line rapid service, and 23 minutes from Shibuya by Inokashira Line express service.

JR East

Station layout
The JR East station consists of two elevated island platforms serving four tracks. It has a "Midori no Madoguchi" staffed ticket office and a "View Plaza" travel agent.

Platforms

Keio

Station layout
The Keio station consists of two elevated side platforms serving two terminating tracks.

Platforms

History
Kichijōji Station opened on 30 December 1899. The Keio station opened on 1 April 1934.

From 22 February 2013, station numbering was introduced on Keio lines, with Kichijōji Station becoming "IN17".

Passenger statistics
In fiscal 2019, the JR station was used by an average of 141,849 passengers daily (boarding passengers only) making it the 22nd busiest JR East station. Over the same fiscal year, the Keio station was used by an average of 146,901 passengers daily (exiting and entering passengers).

The passenger figures for previous years are as shown below.

 Note that JR East figures are for boarding passengers only.

Surrounding area

 Inokashira Park

See also

 List of railway stations in Japan

References

External links

 JR East station information 
 Keio Station information 

Railway stations in Japan opened in 1934
Chūō Main Line
Chūō-Sōbu Line
Stations of East Japan Railway Company
Keio Inokashira Line
Railway stations in Tokyo
Railway stations in Japan opened in 1899
Musashino, Tokyo